Guangzhou Baiyunshan (Simplified Chinese: 广州白云山) was a Chinese football club, located in Guangzhou, Guangdong, China. The club was founded in 1998 and promoted to the second tier of Chinese football league at the end of the 1998 season. The club was disbanded at the end of the 2000 season after failing to promote to the second tier.

They gained five points in the 1999 season (1 win, 2 draws and 19 defeats) and were relegated to the third tier. The only match they won was in the last round of the season, when they defeated Jiangsu Gige 1–0.

Results

Honours
 Chinese Yi League: 1998

International players	
  Eduardo Arriola	
  Patrick Katalay

References

Defunct football clubs in Guangdong
Association football clubs established in 1998
Association football clubs disestablished in 2000
1998 establishments in China
2000 disestablishments in China